HMS Hyacinth was a  corvette of the Royal Navy. She served during the Second World War and achieved three victories over enemy submarines in a highly successful career. Only  managed to repeat such success among her sister ships. She went on to serve in the Royal Hellenic Navy as RHNS Apostolis, was returned to the Royal Navy in 1952 and scrapped in the same year.

Royal Navy
During the Second World War Hyacinth served in the Eastern Mediterranean where she protected the Palestine coastline and escorted numerous convoys along it. She also took part in the Malta convoys.

Since Hyacinth spent most of her time in the Mediterranean, without access to British shipyards, she was not retrofitted as many of her class were, and so retained her short forecastle. Another of her distinctive features was a 3-inch gun instead of the usual 4-inch.

From 1 October 1942 until 5 March 1943 Hyacinth was commanded by Commander R.T. White D.S.O.** (later Captain R.T. White D.S.O.**, 2nd son of Sir Archibald White, Bt. of Wallingwells).

Anti-submarine successes

The submarine was towed into port, repaired and put into operation with the Hellenic Navy under the name Matrosos (Greek: Ματρώζος) in 1943.

Royal Hellenic Navy

In 1943, Hyacinth was transferred to the Royal Hellenic Navy, and was renamed Apostolis (Αποστόλης), from Nikolis Apostolis, an admiral of the Greek War of Independence, and served the remainder of the Second World War under the Greek flag.

References

Sources
 
 
 

 

Flower-class corvettes of the Royal Navy
World War II corvettes of the United Kingdom
1940 ships
Ships built in Belfast
Ships built by Harland and Wolff